In mathematics, a closed n-manifold N embedded in an (n + 1)-manifold M is boundary parallel (or ∂-parallel, or peripheral) if there is an isotopy of N onto a boundary component of M.

An example
Consider the annulus . Let π denote the projection map

If a circle S is embedded into the annulus so that π restricted to S is a bijection, then S is boundary parallel. (The converse is not true.)

If, on the other hand, a circle S is embedded into the annulus so that π restricted to S is not surjective, then S is not boundary parallel. (Again, the converse is not true.)

Geometric topology